Ricky van Haaren (born 21 June 1991) is a Dutch footballer who plays as a midfielder.

Club career

Youth career
Van Haaren started his youth career at Excelsior. In the season 2005–06 he was invited to join the Feyenoord Academy. At Varkenoord, the youngster quickly embellished from a reserve player into a youth international. On 28 November 2007, Van Haaren signed a three-year contract with Feyenoord. Feyenoord's technical director Peter Bosz explained: "Firstly we want to prevent him from joining another club. But we also want to reward him because we think he's doing very well. You often see changing performances at this age, but Ricky had a very consistent season last year." Before even playing a single minute for Feyenoord's first team, Van Haaren renewed his contract till 2012 on 16 February 2010. New technical director Leo Beenhakker claimed to have big plans with the young midfielder. One week after renewing his contract, Van Haaren trained with the first team squad for the first time.

Feyenoord (2010–2012)
Van Haaren made his official debut for Feyenoord's first team on 2 May 2010. He replaced Schenkeveld in the 61st minute in the Eredivisie home match against Heerenveen (6–2). Van Haaren was the fourth player of Feyenoord U19 to make his first team debut this season, after Stefan de Vrij, Luc Castaignos and Bart Schenkeveld.

VVV-Venlo (2012–2013)
In June 2012 Van Haaren left Feyenoord on a free transfer to sign a two-year contract with VVV-Venlo.

ADO Den Haag (2013–2015)
After the relegation of VVV-Venlo, Van Haaren signed with ADO Den Haag to continue playing in the Eredivisie. He scored twice on his debut in a 4-2 defeat away to Feyenoord.

FC Dordrecht (2014–2015)
On 5 August 2014, Van Haaren was sent on loan to Dordrecht until the end of the season.

Dinamo București (2015)
In June 2015, van Haaren signed a contract for two seasons with Dinamo București.
In the middle of August 2015, the Dinamo București coach, Mircea Rednic said it would be best if the player left the club, as he did not show him anything of value so far.
He blamed the short summer preseason preparation time for the mistakes in the current squad selection, while also saying that for foreign players, it is imperative that they show they have something "extra" to the normal Romanian players if they are to stay.

In December 2015, van Haaren ended his contract with Dinamo, after playing in only eight games in Liga I, four of them as a starter.

Quick Boys (2020–2022)
On 11 August 2020, he joined third-tier Dutch club Quick Boys.

Statistics

Statistics accurate as of last match played on 11 December 2015.

Personal life
His younger brother Danny van Haaren is also a footballer.

References

External links
 Official Ricky van Haaren profile on Feyenoord.nl 
Voetbal International profile 
Netherlands U17 stats at OnsOranje
Netherlands U19 stats at OnsOranje
Netherlands U21 stats at OnsOranje

1991 births
Living people
Footballers from Rotterdam
Dutch footballers
Dutch expatriate footballers
Netherlands youth international footballers
Netherlands under-21 international footballers
Feyenoord players
VVV-Venlo players
ADO Den Haag players
FC Dordrecht players
FC Dinamo București players
Şanlıurfaspor footballers
AS Trenčín players
ŠK Slovan Bratislava players
Olimpia Grudziądz players
Quick Boys players
Slovak Super Liga players
Eredivisie players
Liga I players
TFF First League players
I liga players
Dutch expatriate sportspeople in Romania
Dutch expatriate sportspeople in Turkey
Dutch expatriate sportspeople in Slovakia
Dutch expatriate sportspeople in Poland
Expatriate footballers in Romania
Expatriate footballers in Turkey
Expatriate footballers in Slovakia
Expatriate footballers in Poland
Association football midfielders